"Ugh! Your Ugly Houses!" is a song by Chumbawamba. Released in 1995, it served as the lead single from the group's seventh studio album, Swingin' with Raymond. It was later featured on the group's 1999 compilation, Uneasy Listening. The song criticizes the homes featured in celebrity gossip magazines such as Hello. Upon its release, the song attained modest chart success in the United Kingdom, where it became their fourth chart entry, spending one week in the top 100. It was generally well-received by critics, who praised its humorous lyrics and composition.

Lyrics
Ugh! Your Ugly Houses! is often thought to be about suburban neighbourhoods, but is actually about the homes of certain rich celebrities. In AllMusic's review of Uneasy Listening, music critic Alex Ogg summarized the song as "a sideswipe at the non-taste of the celebrities featured in Hello magazine."

Release
The song was first included on the group's 1996 album Swingin' with Raymond. It was again featured on their 1999 compilation Uneasy Listening.

Critical reception
AllMusic's Chris Nickson regarded the song as a highlight of Swingin' with Raymond, praising "the interjection of 'In an English Country Garden' [...] that gets trampled by buzzing punk guitar and beats." Music critic Robert Christgau praised the song as "funny."

Commercial performance
The song was a modest hit in the UK, reaching number 84 on their Singles Chart on the chart dated 21 October 1995, becoming the group's fourth entry on that chart.

Track listing
Adapted from Discogs.
 Ugh! Your Ugly Houses! - 2:23
 Mannequin - 2:30 (originally written by Wire)
 This Girl - 3:43
 Hunchback of Notre Dame - 2:13

References

1995 singles
Chumbawamba songs
One Little Indian Records singles